SOKO Kitzbühel   is an Austrian television series produced by ORF in collaboration with the German network ZDF. It is the third spin-off of the German crime series SOKO 5113 (SOKO München since 2015), launched in 1978. The show, which debuted on 15 November 2001 in Austria and 7 January 2003 in Germany, is set in the Tyrolean tourist centre of Kitzbühel. The last episode aired on 14 December 2021. "SOKO" is an abbreviation of the German word Sonderkommission, which means "special investigative team".

A follow-up series, SOKO Linz, began filming in May 2021.

Synopsis
The story is centered on police detectives Karin Kofler (until 2014), replaced by Nina Pokorny, and Lukas Roither. The team solves complicated murder cases in and around Kitzbühel, many of which involve members of the rich and powerful, common in the resort town. Kofler's father is an amateur detective who often joins the investigations.

Language
Produced primarily for a German market, the language spoken in the series is very close to High German, while in reality, Southern Bavarian is predominant in Tyrol, where Kitzbühel is located. Viennese German and some other Austrian dialects are also spoken in the series, but never the local one.

See also
 List of Austrian television series

References

External links
 
 Filming locations

Kitzbühel
ORF (broadcaster) original programming
Austrian crime television series
2001 Austrian television series debuts
2000s Austrian television series
German-language television shows
Austrian television spin-offs